Ana Yancy Clavel (born April 28, 1992) is a Salvadorian beauty pageant titleholder who was crowned Miss El Salvador in 2012. Clavel represented El Salvador in Miss Universe 2012.

Career
Her career started in the world of modeling participating in TV commercials and Salvadorean brand model Lemour Design. She also participated in national television programs.

Private life
Clavel was born and raised in San Salvador, El Salvador. She has a degree in early childhood education from the University of El Salvador. 

Her hobbies include playing sports, playing the flute, video games and playing pool. In an interview, Clavel stated that she learned Sign Language because one of her cousins lost her hearing due to a stroke.

Beauty Pageants
On April 27 of 2012, Clabel was crowned Estrange Belleza Universo El Salvador 2012. She was crowned by her predecessor Alejandra Ochoa, Nuestra Belleza Bicentenario. She represented El Salvador in Miss Continente Americano 2012 and Miss Universe 2012. In one of her first interviews as Nuestra Belleza El Salvador, she said: "I am very happy for the success. Thank God, my family and friends for all the support they have given me throughout the competition. From now on I will endeavor to rise up the name of El Salvador."
Although considered a favorite for the crown, with the most votes in many Latin popular pages, Clavel failed to enter the Top 16.

References

External links
Ana Yancy Clavel' Official Facebook
Official Nuestra Belleza El Salvador website

1992 births
Living people
Miss Universe 2012 contestants
Miss El Salvador winners
Salvadoran beauty pageant winners